Emmanuel Kellam Olaniyan (born 27 November 1997) is a Nigerian British actor, rapper, television presenter and YouTube personality better known as  Eman Kellam. He is best known for his appearances on The CBBC Channel and his YouTube web show British Slang With Eman Kellam.

Personal life
Olaniyan was born and raised in South London, to parents of Nigerian origin. He attended Forest Hill School. and then The BRIT School for Performing Arts and Technology.

Career

YouTube
Olaniyan started creating content on his YouTube channel "EmansBlogs" in 2012. He started creating video blogs in his kitchen discussing topics that were popular and relevant at that point in time. It was not, however, until 2014 when he uploaded his most viewed video, "Pranking My African Dad", in which he told his father that he had impregnated a 14-year-old girl, that his channel went viral and started to pick up speed and gain subscribers. This video has had over 8 million views as of August 2021 and has been discussed and shared across various platforms including WorldStarHipHop and Bossip. In January 2016, he appeared on the CBBC Channel as Lifebabble talent on the Scottish BAFTA award nominated show Lifebabble.

French Montana collaboration
On 5 November 2016, French Montana premiered his highly anticipated album MC4 on the Apple Music show OVO Sound Radio. The show was curated by multi award-winning artist Drake, Noah "40" Shebib and Oliver El-Khatib in which who Drake also founded the OVO Sound record label with. Olaniyan and his father appeared on the show in a skit linked to a song on MC4 called "Check Come". The skit was taken from Olaniyan's infamous "Pranking My African Dad" prank. Olaniyan confirmed via Twitter that he knew him and his father would be featured and claims he had known and been sworn to secrecy for over two years. So it would be a funny surprise for his and French Montana's followers.

CBBC and BBC "Own It" 
In February 2018 Olaniyan appeared on The CBBC Channel in the United Kingdom as a guest presenter to promote "BBC Own It", a new online learning resource commissioned by the BBC aimed at 9-12 year olds. Covering a range of topics that would relate to children growing up in the digital age. Own It launched nationally on Tuesday 7 February 2018.

YouTube Black Voices
In January 2021 YouTube announced the international list of creators of the inaugural YouTube Black Voices Class of 2021, of which Olaniyan was a UK class member .

Some members of the class of 2021 were also featured in the September 2021 issue of British Vogue in which Olaniyan was also included. Quote from British Vogue feature "As YouTube expands its diverse community, the Class of 2021 are the new figureheads in the making to follow. Prepare to watch those featured here go stratospheric".

British Slang With Celebrities Series
Olaniyan is also known for his "British Slang With Eman Kellam" series on his YouTube channel. In which he asks predominantly American actors to try and figure out the meaning of a slang word commonly used by youth in the United Kingdom. Celebrity guests who have featured include Gabrielle Union, Denzel Washington, Childish Gambino, Regina Hall,  Dave Franco, Cara Delevingne and Golden Globe Award nominated actress and creator of HBO's Insecure, Issa Rae.

Music career

2021
Olaniyan released his secret debut EP "For The Summer" on 10 June 2021. Speaking via Instagram he said "I remember going on tour with Lotto Boyzz in 2017 and seeing how much they loved making music. I was only hosting for them back then, but seeing the passion really inspired me to want to take music seriously. It's been a long time coming. Music is one of the things I love the most. I've grown up around it. Whether that be through my parents blasting Fuji music when I was a kid or me being around P2J in the studio when I was a younger, it's a passion of mine that I can't wait to share with you guys".

Filmography

Film

Television

Discography

Extended Plays

Songwriting credits

References

External links

 https://www.youtube.com/watch?v=E_xlrv59sxs
 https://www.youtube.com/watch?v=eib2B1WzCLY

1997 births
English YouTubers
Living people
Male actors from London
21st-century English male actors
English people of Nigerian descent
People from Lewisham
People educated at Forest Hill School
English male film actors
Black British male actors
Black British television personalities
YouTubers from London